Brian H. Coleman (born 28 May 1935) is a former Australian rules footballer who played with Hawthorn in the Victorian Football League (VFL).

Coleman played six senior games for Hawthorn, all in the 1959 VFL season. He was recruited from Camberwell where he played 49 senior games.

Coaching 
He later served as coach of the Hawthorn Under-19s, he was the only coach to win a premiership for the club, in 1972.

Chairman of Selectors
From 1983 to 1995, Coleman was the Chairman of Selectors at Hawthorn. It was most successful period in Hawthorn's history, winning five premierships and playing finals every year.

Club President
In 1995, the finances at Hawthorn were deteriorating,  boardroom largesse was revealed, and pressure was put upon president Geoff Lord to resign. Coleman was elevated to clean up the finances. Coleman was club president in 1996. He presided over the difficult period when the push for a merger between Hawthorn and  football clubs in 1996. After losing the vote to merge the clubs Coleman stepped down to be replaced by Ian Dicker.

Honours and achievements 
Individual
 Hawthorn Hall of Fame
 Hawthorn life member

References

1935 births
Australian rules footballers from Victoria (Australia)
Hawthorn Football Club players
Camberwell Football Club players
Hawthorn Football Club administrators
Living people